Sarnino may refer to the following places in Bulgaria:

Sarnino, Dobrich Province, a village in General Toshevo Municipality
Sarnino, Smolyan Province